Crash 'n Burn is a futuristic racing/shooter video game developed by Crystal Dynamics and released for the 3DO in 1993. The game was the launch title for the system and was included as a pack-in game with Panasonic's original 3DO console.

Gameplay 

In Crash 'n Burn, players assume the role of any one of six cyberpunks, each equipped with a unique car and a deadly supply of weapons. Full-motion videos of the racers are accessible in between races, in which each character flaunt their skills and insult their opponents with death threats. The game has rally and tournament modes with a total of 30 tracks designed for one player.

Synopsis 

The game is set in the year 2044 AD.

Development and release 

Crystal Dynamics was formed on 8 July 1992 by Sega veterans Judy Lang, Madeline Canepa, and Dave Morse. Crystal was the first licensed developer for 3DO, a gaming hardware platform simultaneously funded by Kleiner Perkins. Mark Cerny joined the company, but he left to work for Universal Interactive Studios. In 1993, Strauss Zelnick, president of 20th Century Fox's film studio, was hired to run Crystal Dynamics. This made national news and helped to touch off the frenzy of multimedia investments of the mid-1990s. A 1993 editorial in Electronic Gaming Monthly declared that "the hottest new video game company on the upscale scene is definitely Crystal Dynamics."

Crash 'n Burn was conceived and produced by Mark Wallace and developed by Crystal Dynamics, with Bill Mitchell and Bill Willis as lead programmers and Mark Cerny as designer. 
Its development team required a small number of artists, including Steve Kongsle. The project was directed by David Burke and E. Daniel Arey was responsible for writing the script used for the product. Burke Trieschmann acted as a composer for the game's score.

The launch of the 3DO in October 1993 received a great deal of attention in the press as part of the "multimedia wave" in the computer world at the time. Return Fire, Road Rash, FIFA International Soccer and Jurassic Park Interactive had been slated for launch releases but were pushed to mid-1994 due to the developers' struggles with the sophisticated hardware. The 3DO Company also made continued updates to the console hardware almost up to the system's release, which resulted in a number of third-party titles missing the launch date and in some cases by less than a month, because the developers were not left enough time to fully test them on the finalized hardware. Its only software available at launch was Crash 'n Burn.  Panasonic also failed to manufacture an ample supply of the console in time for launch day, and as a result most retail stores only received one or two units. By mid-November, it had sold 30,000 units.

In an interview shortly after The 3DO Company dropped support for the system, Trip Hawkins pointed out that it was essentially a lack of coordination between the company, Panasonic and the console's software developers which had led to it launching with only one game ready.

Reception 

Electronic Gaming Monthly gave the game a 7 out of 10. They described it as "a complex and exciting game once you get into [it]", but felt that it was not a strong enough game to sell a system as expensive as the 3DO. 

GamePro praised the game as having the best racing game graphics ever seen in a home system, and also complimented the striking cast of characters, the variety of tracks, and the shopping feature. However, they criticized the lack of multiplayer and the relative shallowness of the racing gameplay (in particular that cars cannot get into crashes), and concluded it to be "a good, not a great, ride."

Crash 'n Burn received the Best Driving Game award from GameFans 1993 Megawards.

Legacy 
Due chiefly to the unexpectedly slow growth of the next generation gaming market, Crystal Dynamics's massive expansion in its early years failed to pay off. In 1996 new CEO Ted Ardel announced the company was cutting one third of its workforce and stepping aside as a publisher to focus strictly on games development. For several months the company functioned without a president, with Ardel managing the day-to-day operations until Rob Dyer was promoted to president on April 4, 1997.

After Crash 'n Burn, Crystal Dynamics would later become known for developing the Legacy of Kain and Gex series of video games, as well as later entries in the Tomb Raider franchise, starting with the 2006 title Tomb Raider: Legend.

References

External links 
 Crash 'n Burn at GameFAQs
 Crash 'n Burn at Giant Bomb
 Crash 'n Burn at MobyGames

1993 video games
3DO Interactive Multiplayer games
3DO Interactive Multiplayer-only games
Cyberpunk video games
Crystal Dynamics games
Science fiction racing games
Pack-in video games
Post-apocalyptic video games
Racing video games
Single-player video games
Vehicular combat games
Video games developed in the United States
Video games scored by Burke Trieschmann
Video games set in the 2040s
Video games set in the future